Leufroyia villaria is a species of sea snail, a marine gastropod mollusk in the family Raphitomidae.

Description
The length of the shell attains 17.3 mm.

Distribution
This species occurs in the Mediterranean Sea off Sicily.

References

 Pusateri F. & Giannuzzi-Savelli R., 2008. A new raphitomine neogastropod from the Mediterranean Sea (Conoidea). Iberus 26(2): 119–126.

External links
 Fassio, G.; Russini, V.; Pusateri, F.; Giannuzzi-Savelli, R.; Høisæter, T.; Puillandre, N.; Modica, M. V.; Oliverio, M. (2019). An assessment of Raphitoma and allied genera (Neogastropoda: Raphitomidae). Journal of Molluscan Studies

villaria
Gastropods described in 2008